Keoshu Yimchunger is an Indian politician from Nagaland who is serving as Member of Nagaland Legislative Assembly from Shamator–Chessore Assembly constituency.

Personal life 
He war born in 16 July 1977 in Tuensang District. He served as Government Primary School teacher from 1997 to 2021.

References 

Nagaland politicians

1977 births
Living people
Nagaland MLAs 2018–2023
Nagaland MLAs 2023–2028
Nationalist Democratic Progressive Party politicians